Chinna Chinna Kannile is a 2000 Tamil-language thriller film directed by Ameerjan. The film stars Prakash Raj, Khushbu and Nassar. It was released on 1 September 2000.

Plot

Rathi (Khushbu), a music video director, lives with her husband Ravi (Nassar) and their two kids. However, she is unaware that her husband is actually a robber. He carries outsmart crimes with his partner Sabesan (Prakash Raj). The police officer Dev (Thalaivasal Vijay) is pressured to arrest them. After a diamond heist gone wrong, Ravi finally gets caught while Sabesan escapes. Ravi managed to hide the diamonds in his house before being hauled off by the police. During the police custody, Ravi is shot by Dev, injuring him heavily. So Ravi is moved to the hospital, and the doctors eventually save his life. Thereafter, Sabesan goes to his ward and questions Ravi about the diamonds. Sabesan even killed his partner to leave oneself a way out. Sabesan is now urged to find the diamonds and enters Rathi's household as Ravi's friend. What transpires later forms the crux of the story.

Cast

Khushbu as Rathi
Nassar as Ravi
Prakash Raj as Sabesan
Thalaivasal Vijay as Dev
Vadivelu as Velan
Charle as Balan
Dr. Sharmila as Sharmila
Mohan V. Ram
M.Bhanumathi
Sharmili as Hamsa
Brahmaguru
Kanagarajan
Ramesh
Sagayaraj
Master Vasanth Saravana as Tinku
Baby Aishwarya as Pinky
Raghuvannan as Suresh
Muthukaalai as beggar
Ramji as himself

Soundtrack

The film score and the soundtrack were composed by Sampath Selvan. The soundtrack, released in 2000, features 5 tracks with lyrics written by Vairamuthu, Thamarai, Na. Muthukumar, Robert and Ameerjan.

Reception
Balaji Balasubramaniam gave the film 2 stars out of 4 and said : "After a good setup with lots of potential, it lets the opportunity for a good thriller slip away with its relaxed screenplay and lack of logic".

References

2000 films
2000s Tamil-language films
Indian heist films
Indian thriller films
Films directed by Ameerjan
2000s heist films
2000 thriller films